Lynn Bowles is a British broadcaster and a former traffic weekday mornings reporter for BBC Radio 2.

Early life
Bowles was born in Splott, Cardiff, Wales, and is the youngest of three siblings. Her father, Cliff, was a marine engineer; her mother, Josephine, was born in Monmouth but moved to Rumney in Cardiff.

Bowles attended St Hilda's School, a boarding school in Somerset, before moving to Llanishen High School when the family lived in Rudry. She went on to university in Coventry.

Broadcasting career
After university, Bowles worked in New Orleans  for a TV news station. She returned to the UK in the early 1990s but struggled to find work. Eventually she secured a position as a traffic reporter with LBC, on Richard Littlejohn's show. She subsequently joined the Nationwide programme on BBC Radio 5 Live where she remained for eight years before moving to BBC Radio 2 in 2000 as the first official traffic news reporter for weekday mornings.

From Saturday 9 June 2012, and for eight consecutive weeks, Bowles presented her own show on BBC Radio Wales, featuring guests such as Ken Bruce with whom she appeared as travel reporter on his show on BBC Radio 2.

Since 2 November 2014, she has presented a weekly Sunday afternoon show on BBC Radio Wales.

On 16 March 2018, during The Chris Evans Breakfast Show and Ken Bruce's mid-morning show, Bowles announced that she would be leaving BBC Radio 2, after 18 years of broadcasting. Her last day was 29 March 2018. Bowles continues with her BBC Radio Wales broadcasting.

Personal and charitable activities
Bowles learnt to drive in a Land Rover and became a mascot for the marque after competing in the 2004 run of the Macmillan 4x4 UK Challenge and co-presenting the Heritage Motor Centre Land Rover show from 2005 to 2010.

In the August 2013 issue of Land Rover Owner international magazine Bowles was a guest columnist 'for one month only' discussing her childhood experiences in Land Rovers and her time training for the Camel Trophy .

She is an ambassador for Bobath Children's Therapy Centre Wales, a registered charity based in Cardiff that provides specialist Bobath therapy to children from all over Wales who have cerebral palsy. In the November 2007 Children in Need week a "Money can't buy" experience was auctioned which included spending a day with her at Land Rover and other automotive experiences under the banner of 'Petrolheads', and the item raised £22,000 for the charity.

As of June 2009 Bowles was living in Wimbledon but regularly travelled back to her family home in the village of Rudry near Caerphilly.

See also
 Sally Boazman

References

External links
Lynn Bowles's profile at BBC Online
Lynn Bowles (BBC Radio Wales)

Living people
Mass media people from Cardiff
British radio personalities
British radio presenters
BBC Radio Wales presenters
BBC Radio 2 presenters
Year of birth missing (living people)